Frances Ulric Cole (September 9, 1905 – May 21, 1992) was an American pianist, editor, music educator and composer. She was born in New York and studied in Los Angeles with Homer Grunn, and at the Institute of Musical Arts in New York City (now known as the Juilliard School) and in Paris with Nadia Boulanger.

Life and work 
Two of her compositions, Piano Quintet and Violin Sonata no.1, won awards from the Society for the Publication of American Music. Her orchestral  compositions have been performed by symphonies in Cincinnati, Sydney, Rochester, Scranton and Lansdowne.

Cole was a founding member of the Society of American Women Composers. She worked as a music teacher for years and, when she became dissatisfied with teaching, she took an editorial position for Time Magazine from 1945 to 1952. 

In her later years, she travelled widely and for a time lived on the islands of Tahiti and Vanatu in the South Pacific Ocean and composed Sunlight Channel in 1948. Cole died in Bridgeport, Connecticut in 1992.

Works
Cole composed mainly for orchestra, chamber ensemble and piano. 
Above the Clouds for piano (pub. 1924)
Prelude and Fugue in C Minor for two pianos (unpublished; 1924)
Tunes & Sketches in Black and White for piano (pub. 1926)
Purple Shadows for piano (pub. 1928)
Sonata for violin and piano (pub. 1930)
Hobgoblins for piano (pub. 1931)
The Prairies for piano (pub. 1931)
Round Dance for string quartet (unpublished; 1935)
Vignettes for piano (pub. 1936)
Piano Trio
Divertimento for string orchestra and piano (pub. 1939)
Quintet for piano, 2 violins, viola, and violoncello (pub. 1941)
Metropolitones: Three Compositions for the Piano (pub. 1943)
"Man-about-town" from Metropolitones arranged for two pianos, four hands (pub. 1947)
Nevada for orchestra (unpublished; 1947)
Sunlight Channel for orchestra (unpublished; 1949)
Divertimento arranged for two pianos (unpublished; 1971)

References

External links
 Jascha Zayde plays two pieces from Cole's Metropolitones (at YouTube.com)
 Joanna Goldstein plays Cole's Metropolitones (at YouTube.com)

1905 births
1992 deaths
20th-century classical composers
American classical composers
American women classical composers
American music educators
Piano pedagogues
Pupils of Percy Goetschius
20th-century American composers
20th-century American women musicians
20th-century American musicians
Women music educators
20th-century women composers